Korotoyak is the name of several rural localities in Russia:
Korotoyak, Altai Krai, a selo in Korotoyaksky Selsoviet of Khabarsky District in Altai Krai; 
Korotoyak, Voronezh Oblast, a selo in Korotoyakskoye Rural Settlement of Ostrogozhsky District in Voronezh Oblast